After the General Elections  held in January 1989 the  Governor appointed M. Karunanidhi as Chief Minister heading the new  Government  with effect from 27 January 1989. The Governor on the advice of Chief Minister appointed 16 more Ministers on the same day.

Cabinet ministers

References 

Dravida Munnetra Kazhagam
Tamil Nadu ministries
1980s in Tamil Nadu
1990s in Tamil Nadu
1989 establishments in Tamil Nadu
1991 disestablishments in India
Cabinets established in 1989
Cabinets disestablished in 1991